Henning-Tahy Wars, was a series of armed conflicts and legal disputes between faction centered around Ursula Meknitzer Henning and faction centered around Ferenc Tahy, over the control of Susedgrad castle. Throughout their strife for the possession of this castle, the rival nobles also attempted to incite its rival's peasants against their own master, which was one of the causes for major Croatian-Slovene Peasant Revolt in 1573.

Background 
Susedgrad was an important castle on western banks of Medvednica mountain. The castle served as an overwatch over trade route along Sava river valley. It was originally built somewhere between 13 and 14 century. Throughout the history, the castle changed several owners, until one of the owners - Andras Bathory, sold its share of the possession to Franjo Tahy in 1564, as he never was in Susedgrad anyway, due to his service in Hungary. This caused a long conflict between Tahis and Hennings which owned the remaining share of the possession. 

Knowing that this partial sale of Susedgrad to Tahy, might upset the remaining owners, Tahy was secretly brought to Susedgrad by royal representative and Kaptol deputy. Upon finding out about this, the remaining owners led by Ursula Henning became very upset and protested against Tahy's arrival, saying that the whole process was illegal. According to historian Krivošić, Ursula actually had the right of first purchase but the ruler ignored the law because of Tahys wartime merits. Tahy also refused to give in to Ursula, and attempted to use his good family connections to win his case.

Conflicts

Tahy asserts power 
Once moved in, Tahy had Ursula and her family completely isolated from the outside world. He deployed 40 of his soldiers to hold Hennings hostage inside. Tahy also started his cruel treatment of local peasants and forbade them to make contact with Ursula. Ursula then complained to the king about Tahy's behaviour, but without much success.

Hennings expel Tahys 
In 1565, when Tahy was away fighting the Ottomans in Hungary, Ursula Henning assembled the 800 strong army of local peasants, who then came to Susedgrad and purged Tahy's family out and looted their possessions worth 25 000 Forints.  Tahy then complained to the ruler, but Ursula refused to obey to his orders. Upon learning of violent Henning takeover, ban of Croatia, Peter Erdody, assembled his own army and marched them off to Susedgrad in order to punish Ursula and re-install Tahys back to their possession.

The Battle of Susedgrad 
Upon learning this, Ursula's ally - Croatian viceban Ambroz Gregorijanec, along with other Henning family members again assembled 3000 strong peasant army. Hennings deployed their peasant army both inside the fortress and on nearby ambush positions. On 2 July 1565, ban's army consisting of few hundred cavalrymen, few hundred haramijas and three cannons arrived on plains below Susedgrad castle. On the eve of July 3rd, Erdody's army approached close to Susedgrad and started bombarding it with cannon fire. 

Henning's peasants who awaited in ambush, swiftly attacked the ban's army and in "short but bloody skirmish", killed many of Erdody's men, some of whom drowned in Sava river while trying to flee. Throughout the battle, Henning's peasant army completely defeated the army of Croatian ban and even managed to capture 3 cannons and banner of Croatian ban in the process. They also gravely wounded distinguished nobles such as Petar Keglević and Petar Ratkay, who had to be treated for their wounds in Zagreb. Although most of his army was annihilated near the castle, Erdody refused to withdraw completely, but went on to raid Susedgrad seigniory countryside.

Restoration of Tahy 
Because of waging a battle against the state authorities, Gregorijanec was relieved of his position of viceban on Croatian sabor on 25 July 1566, while Ursula was trialed against.Tahy also forced Hennings to lay off their officials who assembled the peasant army and prepared the battle. In 1566., Tahy was again brought in on his half of Susedgrad-Stubica seigniory, while its remaining half was confiscated by Royal Chamber, until the court case against Ursula was resolved. Tahy used this opportunity to make his revenge against those peasants and officials who fought or sided with Ursula against him. His Henning adversaries, also sent complaints of their own against Tahy to the king. Eventually, the investigation was launched, and it was concluded with a giant, six meters long list of accusations for all sorts of brutalities against Tahy, since lots of witnesses spoke against him. The investigation also further sparked the peasant movement against Tahy. 

While Ursula was banned from Susedgrad by the state because she fought a battle against ban's army in 1566, Tahy's continuous and constant strifes with the peasants on his estate culminated in Croatian - Slovene Peasant Revolt of 1573. Soon after the revolt was crushed, Tahy died in 1573.

End of the conflict 
In 1584, the Hennings bought again Tahy's part of the estate for price of 44 000 Forints, which had put an end to this years long conflict.

In popular culture 

 1565 Battle of Susedgrad was described in August Šenoa's 1877 novel Seljačka buna.

Litterature 

 Enciklopedija Hrvatskog zagorja, Leksikografski zavod Miroslav Krleža, Zagreb, 2017.
 Klaić, Vjekoslav, Povijest Hrvata, knjiga peta, Nakladni zavod Matice hrvatske, Zagreb, 1988.

References 

Peasant revolts
16th century military history of Croatia
16th-century rebellions